(born June 10 in Shizuoka, Japan) is a Japanese shojo mangaka best known for creating the manga series Hot Gimmick. She debuted with Lip Conscious! in Betsucomi. Aihara frequently serialized her series in Betsucomi but has had her works serialized in Cheese! in the past several years. Although none of Aihara's series have been adapted into anime, Hot Gimmick has received two drama CDs, a light novel spinoff titled Hot Gimmick S and a live-action film adaptation, while 5-ji Kara 9-ji Made has been adapted into a live-action television drama.

Works
A † indicates the work has been published in English.

Series

Oneshots

Other

References

External links
Miki Aihara's blog  (in Japanese)
 

Living people
Women manga artists
Manga artists from Shizuoka Prefecture
People from Shizuoka Prefecture
Japanese female comics artists
Female comics writers
Japanese women writers
Japanese writers
Year of birth missing (living people)